Darnétal (Norman: Dernétal) is a commune in the Seine-Maritime department in the Normandy region in northern France.

Geography
Two small rivers flow through the town, the Robec and the Aubette.SNCF operates a TER service, having a railway station in the town.

Heraldry

Population

Places of interest
 The churches of St.Ouen and of St.Pierre, both dating from the sixteenth century.
 Traces of a feudal castle.
 A restored watermill.

Notable people
The activist René Valentin Binet, (1913–1957) was born here.
Blessed Father Jacques Hamel (1930-2016), first priest to be killed by ISIL in Europe.

See also
Communes of the Seine-Maritime department

References

External links

 Official Darnétal website 
 Darnétal Festival website 

Communes of Seine-Maritime